Kyrgyzstan first competed at the Deaflympics for the first time in 2009. Kyrgyzstan also won a bronze medal for wrestling in their first Deaflympic event. Currently Kyrgyzstan has won a total of 3 medals in Deaflympics.

Kyrgyzstan yet to participate at the Winter Deaflympics.

Medal tallies

Summer Deaflympics

See also 
 Kyrgyzstan at the Olympics
 Kyrgyzstan at the Paralympics

References 

Kyrgyzstan at the Deaflympics
Deaf culture in Kyrgyzstan